A Few Green Leaves is the final novel by Barbara Pym, first published in 1980, the year of Pym's death. Although several novels were published posthumously, A Few Green Leaves was the final novel she worked on.

Synopsis
Anthropologist Emma Howick arrives in a small English village in the late 1970s, wanting to write a piece on how village life has changed (or not changed). Emma spends her days trying to examine the residents, treating them as subjects for her paper, including the vicar and his sister, the feuding local doctors and their wives, a food critic, and the resident spinsters and bohemians. Emma ponders whether she could adjust permanently to village life, and notes the changes that time has wrought on local customs. Among them are the decline of the manor house, which was once the site of regular gatherings for locals, but is now off limits, and the life of the vicar, Tom. Whereas previous generations of vicars were cared for by the community, with dinner invites most nights, Tom struggles to get support from the residents, and is largely unable to cook or perform basic functions for himself. As in early Pym novels, the Anglican church plays a key role, even though by now the local church attracts few attendees.

Emma is a steadfastly single woman, to the disapproval of her mother and others, who seem to see her career goals as incomplete without marriage. Emma faces two potential love matches. First, her former lover Graham Pettifer - also an academic - rents a cottage near the village to complete a text he is working on, and Emma feels herself pulled back into his life. She finds herself unappealing next to her love rival, the glamorous Claudia. Second, the vicar Tom's sister moves away, leaving him to his own devices, and he begins to view Emma as a romantic partner. Ultimately, Emma chooses to remain in the village, write a novel, and pursue a relationship with Tom. Although much has declined in village life, Emma decides to step back from her objective scientific view of the community and join them.

Publication history
Pym had worked and lived in London since 1946, but in 1971 she moved with her sister Hilary to a cottage in the Oxfordshire countryside, and lived there permanently after her retirement in 1974 from her professional career as an editor and assistant on an academic journal. Since moving to Finstock, Pym had wanted to write another novel set in a village, like her early novels had been. She was especially interested in the way that village life had changed since she began writing her first novel in 1936. As was her custom, Pym kept detailed notebooks on her observances of daily life, and had been making notes that would form the book at least as early as 1976. Pym wryly commented that the new novel may be a letdown after her more pointed social commentaries, "a dull village novel with no bi- or homosexuality; Pym had written sympathetic homosexual characters as early as 1958's A Glass of Blessings, long before it was fashionable or socially acceptable to do so.

Pym considered several working titles for the novel including Two Green Apricots, The Nectarine and the Cuckoo, Green Desert, Green Paradise and Dog's Mercury 

Pym noted in a letter on 25 October 1978 that she was struggling to write the novel however by 14 February 1979 she had finished the first draft. Around that time, Pym was diagnosed with a malignant tumour, a return of the breast cancer she had successfully battled in 1971. She was told that she likely did not have long to live, which compelled Pym to attempt to complete the final copy of the novel. By August, she was still attempting to refine the novel but was beginning to feel the effects of chemotherapy and her degraded physical condition. Pym finished A Few Green Leaves in October 1979. She was not entirely happy with the quality of the final version, but no longer had the strength to keep writing. In Pym's initial draft of the novel, Emma's decision to stay in the village and pursue the love affair was present, but it was more tentative; she made the decision more concrete in the final draft 

Pym died on 11 January 1980. The novel was published the same year by Macmillan in Great Britain and E.P. Dutton in the United States. Pym's literary executor Hazel Holt helped finalise revisions after Pym's death. The novel was released as an audiobook in the 1980s by Chivers Press narrated by Jan Francis. The novel was published in Italy in 1994 as Qualche foglia verde and in France in 1987 as Un brin de verdure.

Critical response
Reviews of A Few Green Leaves were more mixed than its immediate predecessors, Quartet in Autumn and The Sweet Dove Died, which had been successful. The New York Times regarded the novel as equal to anything Pym had previously written  and Penelope Fitzgerald - reviewing for the London Review of Books - found it to be the work of a "brilliant comic writer". However Kirkus Reviews felt that the book was "minor Pym--really just a neutral-toned catchall of her acute angles on loneliness and the ravages of time-marching-on", but would appeal to her devoted fans.

Pym's longtime friend, literary critic Robert Liddell, referred to the book and its sombre-but-hopeful tone as "Barbara's farewell to her readers".

Critics have examined the way in which Pym shows how "[m]odernity has crept into this more contemporary version of provincial life", including the changes in gender norms represented by the married couples in the book, the impact of modern technology, and the way in which the vicar's central role in village life in previous generations has largely been supplanted by doctors and self-sufficiency. Janice Rossen sees the novel as a final statement by Pym on life. "[It] is a novel about older, single people who live self-consciously and carefully, on occasion bravely. And so, it seems, did Pym". Nicholas Shrimpton, writing in New Statesman, also saw the novel as a reflection on Pym's own relationship with the world.

Connections to other works
Pym's novels regularly feature reappearances of characters from previous novels. Here, the character of Wilf Bason from A Glass of Blessings is mentioned, and Tom reads the obituary of Fabian Driver, one of the main characters in Jane and Prudence. Most notably, Emma attends the memorial service of anthropological research assistant Esther Clovis. Esther appeared in three Pym novels, starting with Excellent Women, and her memorial service is also seen - from a different point of view - in the novel An Academic Question. Numerous characters from Excellent Women and Less than Angels appear briefly at the memorial.

Pym considered having the characters of Letty and Marjorie, from her novel Quartet in Autumn, come to live in the village in A Few Green Leaves.

References

1980 British novels
Novels by Barbara Pym
Macmillan Publishers books